is a passenger railway station in located in the city of Toyooka, Hyōgo Prefecture, Japan, operated by the private railway company Willer Trains (Kyoto Tango Railway).

Lines
Kōnotori-no-sato Station is a station of the Miyazu Line, and is located 80.6 kilometers from the terminus of the line at Nishi-Maizuru Station.

Station layout
The station consists of one ground-level side platform serving a single bi-directional line. The station is unattended.

Adjacent stations

History
The station name was changed on April 1, 2015.

Passenger statistics
In fiscal 2019, the station was used by an average of 2 passengers daily.

Surrounding area
Japan National Route 178
Japan National Route 312
Hyogo Prefectural Homeland for the Oriental white Stork (28-minute walk)
Kukuhi Shrine
Genbudo

See also
List of railway stations in Japan

References

External links

Official home page 

Railway stations in Japan opened in 1929
Railway stations in Hyōgo Prefecture
Toyooka, Hyōgo